Seacat was a British short-range surface-to-air missile system intended to replace the ubiquitous Bofors 40 mm gun aboard warships of all sizes. It was the world's first operational shipboard point-defence missile system, and was designed so that the Bofors guns could be replaced with minimum modification to the recipient vessel and (originally) using existing fire-control systems. A mobile land-based version of the system was known as Tigercat.

The initial GWS.20 version was manually controlled, in keeping with the need for a rapidly developed and deployed system. Several variants followed; GWS.21 added radar-cued manual control for night and bad-weather use, GWS.22 added a SACLOS automatic guidance mode, and the final GWS.24 had fully automatic engagement. Tigercat saw relatively brief service before being replaced in British service by the Rapier, while Seacat saw longer service until being replaced by Sea Wolf and newer technology close-in weapons systems.

Seacat and Tigercat were both successful in the export market and some remain in service to this day.

History
Seacat traces its history to the Short Brothers of Belfast SX-A5 experiments to convert the Malkara anti-tank missile to radio control as a short-range surface-to-air missile. This led to further modifications as the "Green Light" prototype, and finally emerged as Seacat.

As it was based on an anti-tank weapon, the Seacat was small and flew at relatively slow, subsonic speeds. It was thought to be useful against first and second generation 1950s jet aircraft of Hawker Sea Hawk performance, which were proving to be too difficult for the WWII-era Bofors 40/L60 guns to successfully intercept. It ultimately replaced the "Orange Nell" development programme for a lighter weapon than the enormous Seaslug missile.

The first public reference to the name Seacat was April 1958, when Shorts was awarded a contract to develop a close-in short-range surface-to-air missile. Royal Navy acceptance of Seacat as a point defence system, to replace the 40/L60 or the newer and more effective Bofors 40/L70 with proximity fuzed shells. It would also be useful against large, slow anti-shipping missiles, like the Styx, which was being deployed by the Warsaw Pact and various clients of the Soviet Union. It was also seen as offering useful secondary roles as a lightweight weapon to use against light commercial shipping and fast attack craft.

The missile was shown for the first time to the general public at the 1959 Farnborough Air Show. The first acceptance trials of the Seacat on a warship was in 1961 aboard . The Seacat became the first operational guided missile to be fired by a warship of the Royal Navy. Later it was adopted by the Swedish Navy, making it the first British guided missile to be fired by a foreign navy.

Design
The Seacat is a small, subsonic missile powered by a two-stage solid fuel rocket motor. It is steered in flight by four cruciformly arranged swept wings and is stabilised by four small tail fins. It is guided by command line-of-sight (CLOS) via a radio-link; i.e., flight commands are transmitted to it from a remote operator with both the missile and target in sight. In some senses it was no more than an initially unguided subsonic rocket that took the controller about 7 seconds, or 500 yards flight time to acquire and lock onto radar tracking and optical direction, making it unsuitable for close in AA defence.

Seacat was mounted on a powered four-round launcher which was smaller than the Mark 5 Twin Bofors and STAAG type mountings it replaced. It was also lighter, easier to maintain, and very easy to use.

Variants
Initially, all Seacat installations used a 4-round,  trainable launcher, but a 3-round,  launcher was later developed. Both launchers were manually reloaded and carried an antenna for the radio command link. All that was required to fit the system to a ship was the installation of a launcher, the provision of a missile handling room and a suitable guidance system. Seacat was used by NATO and Commonwealth navies that purchased British equipment and was exported worldwide. It has also been integrated with a variety of alternative guidance systems, the most common being Dutch HSA systems. The four systems used by the Royal Navy are described below.

GWS-20

This  - "Guided Weapon System 20" - was the initial system, which was intended to replace the twin 40 mm Bofors Mark V gun and its associated fire-control systems. The original director was based on the STD (Simple Tachymetric Director) and was entirely visual in operation. The target was acquired visually with the missile being guided, via a radio link, by the operator inputting commands on a joystick. Flares on the missile's tail fins aided identifying the missile.

's GWS-20 was trialled on board HMS Decoy, a  destroyer, in 1961; it was subsequently removed. It was carried in active service by the  landing ships, the Type 12M Rothesay-class and Type 12I Leander-class frigates, the Type 61 AD frigates HMS Lincoln and HMS Salisbury, and the first group of  escorts. HMS Kent and HMS London updated to GWS22 in the early 1970s. It was originally intended that all  destroyers should receive GWS20 and the class were prepared accordingly. In the event only  and HMS Caprice received it, in 1966 refits.

GWS-21
GWS-21 was the Seacat system associated with a modified Close Range Blind Fire analogue fire control director (CRBFD) with Type 262 radar. This offered manual radar-assisted (Dark Fire) tracking and guidance modes as well as 'eyeball' visual modes. It was carried as the design anti-aircraft weapon of the Type 81 Tribal-class frigate, the four  AD conversions, on the first four County-class destroyers, HMNZS Otago and HMNZS Taranaki, and HMS Eagle. It was last used after sale to the Indonesian Navy and refit by Vospers Thornycroft in 1984 of, T81 Tartar, Ashanti and Gurkha.

GWS-22
GWS-22 was the Seacat system associated with the full MRS-3 fire control director with Type 904 radar and was the first ACLOS-capable (Automatic, Command Line-Of-Sight) Seacat. It was fitted to most of the Leander, Rothesay and County-class escorts as they were refitted and modified in the 1970s, as well as the aircraft carrier . It could operate in automatic radar-guided (Blindfire), manual radar-guided, manual CCTV-guided or, in an emergency, 'eyeball' guided modes. It saw active service in the Falklands onboard all these classes.

GWS-24
The final Royal Navy Seacat variant, this used the Italian Alenia Orion RTN-10X fire control system with Type 912 radar and was fitted only to the Type 21 frigate. This variant saw active service in the Falklands.

Tigercat
A land-based mobile version of Seacat based on a three-round, trailer-mounted launcher towed by a Land Rover with a second trailer carrying fire control equipment. Tigercat was used exclusively by 48 Squadron RAF Regiment between 1967 and 1978, before being replaced by Rapier. Tigercat was also operated by Argentina, India, Iran, Jordan, South Africa and Qatar.

Hellcat 
"Hellcat", an air-to-surface version to give light helicopters a capability against fast attack craft and other high-speed naval targets, was considered in the late 1960s. Two missiles would be carried on a pair of pylons on the helicopter, with an optical sight mounted through the cabin roof. Hellcat was also considered for COIN purposes, with four missiles carried on a militarised Short Skyvan. Despite being offered by Shorts for some years, it does not seem to have been sold.

Seacat Target
"Seacat Target"" is a specialised target vehicle based on the Seacat and is used to simulate sea-skimming missiles for practising a ship's air defence against. Introduced in 1986 it uses the first and second stages of Seacat with the addition of a special target head in place of the missile's warhead. The target missile can be fired from the standard Seacat launcher.

Service

The first warship to have the system fitted operationally was the Battle-class destroyer, in February 1962. The Seacat became obsolete by the 1970s due to increasing aircraft speed and the introduction of supersonic, sea-skimming anti-ship missiles. In these cases, the manually guided subsonic Seacat was totally unsuited to all but head-on interceptions and then only with adequate warning. A Seacat version was tested for intercepting targets flying at high speed near the water surface. This version used a radar altimeter, which kept the missile from being guided below a certain altitude above the surface and hence prevented the operator from flying the missile into the water. This version was never ordered.

Falklands conflict
Despite being obsolete, the Seacat was still widely fielded by the Royal Navy at the outbreak of the Falklands War and was the main anti-aircraft defence of many ships. It proved more reliable than the more modern Seawolf that had been recently introduced, although HMS Ardent's launcher failed at a at critical moment when the ship was under air attack. Initial British postwar reports claimed that Seacat had destroyed eight aircraft, but these did not stand up to scrutiny and no "kill" could be solely attributed to the Seacat, despite it being fired on many occasions.

Seacat may have been involved in the destruction of three Argentine A-4C Skyhawks although these aircraft were subjected to the full force of San Carlos air defences; other claims to the same kills include Rapier, Blowpipe and ship-based gunfire. On 12 June,  launched a Seacat at an incoming Exocet missile which may have been deviated by the close detonation, but not enough to cause a miss. The destroyer was hit and heavily damaged in the attack.

Argentina deployed Tigercats from GADA 601. Seven Tigercat launchers were captured by the British after the war, some being ex-RAF units.

After the Falklands conflict, a radical and urgent re-appraisal of anti-aircraft weaponry was undertaken by the Royal Navy. This saw Seacat rapidly withdrawn from service and replaced by modern weapons systems such as the Goalkeeper CIWS, more modern 20 mm and 30 mm anti-aircraft guns and new escorts carrying the Sea Wolf missile, including the vertical launch version.

Sweden
The missiles were fitted to the four Swedish  destroyers, replacing three Bofors L/70 guns (a more modern and heavier variant than the Royal Navy's L/60) with a single launcher on each ship. The Östergötland-class destroyers, which were of late 1950s origin, were retired in the early 1980s.

Australia
Seacat was mounted on all six  destroyer escorts of the Royal Australian Navy and was removed from service when the final ship of this class was decommissioned in the late 1990s. In their final variant, fire control was provided by HSA M44 radar/optical directors. Secondary firing positions based on visual tracking of the target through binoculars mounted on a syncro-feedback mount was also available.  was the final ship to live fire the system prior to its removal from service; and this was also the only time three missiles were on the launcher and fired in sequence, resulting in one miss and two hits on towed targets.

Operators

 
 Argentine Army: Four Tigercat launchers captured in the Falklands Conflict.
 Argentine Navy: Two Seacat launchers installed on the cruiser  in 1967
 Argentine Marines: Three Argentine Marines' Tigercat launchers captured in the Falklands Conflict. Now replaced with RBS 70.
 
 Royal Australian Navy
 
 Brazilian Navy
 
 Chilean Navy
 
 
 
 Indian Army – Tigercat
 Indian Navy – Seacat
 
 Imperial Iranian Air Force – Tigercat
 Islamic Republic of Iran Army – Tigercat
 Islamic Republic of Iran Navy – Seacat
 
 Royal Jordanian Land Force – Tigercat
 
 Libyan Navy
 
 Royal Malaysian Navy
 
 Royal New Zealand Navy
 
 Royal Netherlands Navy
 
 Nigerian Navy
 
 
 Pakistan Navy Type 21 frigate
 
 Military of Qatar – Tigercat
 
 South African Air Force – Tigercat, known as 'Hilda' locally
 
 Swedish Navy –  destroyers after refit
 
 Royal Thai Navy
 
 Royal Air Force – Tigercat
 Royal Navy – Seacat
 
 Navy of Venezuela
 
 Army of Zimbabwe – Tigercat

See also
Rainbow Codes

References

Sources 

Naval Armament, Doug Richardson, Jane's Publishing, 1981, 
Modern Combat Ships 5; Type 21, Captain John Lippiett RN, Ian Allan, 1990, 
5th Infantry Brigade in the Falklands,  Nicholas Van der Bijl, David Aldea, Leo Cooper, 2003, 
74 Days: An Islander's Diary of the Falklands Occupation,  John Smith, Century, 1984, 
World Naval Weapons Systems, Norman Friedman, The Naval Institute Press, 1989,

External links
Footage of test firings of Seacat, 1959

Naval surface-to-air missiles
Surface-to-air missiles of the United Kingdom
Naval weapons of the United Kingdom
Military equipment introduced in the 1960s
Short Brothers missiles